La pasión de Teresa is a Venezuelan telenovela written by Ibsen Martínez and produced by RCTV in 1989. The telenovela lasted for 145 episodes and was distributed internationally by RCTV International.

Astrid Carolina Herrera and Carlos Mata starred as the protagonists.

Plot
In a convent in Miami, Teresa is about to take her vows as a novice when she receives news of her father's death through murder. She begins to have doubts about her vocation and decides to leave the convent to take revenge on her father's murderer. Her efforts are frustrated by her step-mother Sabrina, but she ends up also discovering love in the form of two twin brothers who are the opposite of each other. Guillermo is there to support her always but also discovers through him, the underground mafia of the city. On the other hand, Alberto desires Teresa for her fortune and begins a game of taking his brother's place in order to be closer to Teresa.

Cast
Astrid Carolina Herrera as Teresa
Carlos Mata as Alberto/Guillermo
Hilda Abrahamz as Peggy San Juan
Rosita Vásquez as Amanda
Ana Karina Manco as Érika
Carlos Cámara Jr. as Arístides Vargas
Rebeca Alemán
José Oliva as Alberto
Mimí Lazo as Sabrina Carvajal
Elisa Parejo as Azalea
Humberto Tancredi as Arias
Reina Hinojosa as  Celeste
Gledys Ibarra as Dolores
Guillermo Ferrán
Irina Rodríguez -Mónica
Carlota Sosa as Franca Velasco
Lupe Gehrenbeck
Dante Carlé as Diego López
Pedro Durán as Fabricio
Carmen Arencibia
Manuel Gassol
Verónica Doza
Ernesto Mérida
Ana María Paredes
Yajaira Paredes
Zulay García
Olga Rojas

References

External links

Opening Credits

1989 telenovelas
RCTV telenovelas
Venezuelan telenovelas
1989 Venezuelan television series debuts
1989 Venezuelan television series endings
Spanish-language telenovelas
Television shows set in Miami